Limatula hodgsoni is a species of bivalve mollusc in the family Limidae, the file shells or file clams. It is native to the seas around Antarctica.

Description
The shell is white, oblong, thin, narrow above and somewhat convex; the posterior side is less curved than the  anterior. The umbones are central and the ligament area is narrow and diamond-shaped. The valves are sculpted by 30 to 35 squamate ribs separated by grooves slightly narrower than the ribs. The ribs are finely marked by the annual growth lines.

Distribution
Limatula hodgsoni is found on the seabed of the waters around Antarctica at depths down to at least . In some areas, this zone is characterised by a layer of sponge spicules and dead mollusc shells a metre or more thick, overgrown by living sponges. This matrix is a biodiverse habitat rich in sea anemones, polychaete worms, hydroids, bryozoans and molluscs. Limatula hodgsoni is the most abundant bivalve mollusc in this habitat and is preyed on by the starfishes Odontaster validus  and Diplasterias brucei.

References

Limidae
Molluscs described in 1907